This bibliography of Deobandi Movement is a selected list of generally available scholarly resources related to Deobandi Movement, a revivalist movement within Sunni Islam, adhering to the Hanafi school of law, formed in the late 19th century around the Darul Uloom Deoband in British India, from which the name derives, by Muhammad Qasim Nanautavi, Rashid Ahmad Gangohi and several others, after the Indian Rebellion of 1857–58. It is one of the most influential reform movements in modern Islam. Islamic Revival in British India: Deoband, 1860-1900 by Barbara D. Metcalf was the first major monograph specifically devoted to the institutional and intellectual history of this movement. Muhammad Tayyib Qasmi wrote a book named The Tradition of the Scholars of Deoband: Maslak Ulama-i-Deoband, a primary source on the contours of Deobandi ideology. In this work, he tried to project Deoband as an ideology of moderation that is a composite of various knowledge traditions in Islam. This list will include Books and theses written on Deobandi Movement and articles published about this movement in various journals, newspapers, encyclopedias, seminars, websites etc. in APA style. Only bibliography related to Deobandi Movement will be included here, for Darul Uloom Deoband, see Bibliography of Darul Uloom Deoband.

The bibliography covers works in multiple languages, including English, Urdu, Arabic, and Persian. It includes works on the movement's founders and key figures, its intellectual and religious traditions, and its relationship to other Islamic movements and schools of thought. The bibliography also covers works on the social and political impact of the Deobandi Movement, including its role in the partition of India and the creation of Pakistan. The bibliography provides a resource for scholars and researchers interested in the history and impact of the Deobandi Movement.

Encyclopedias

Books

Biographies

Theses

Journals

Newspapers

Seminars

Documentaries

Websites

Other

Theses

Books

See also 
 Bibliography of Darul Uloom Deoband
 List of Deobandi organisations
 List of Deobandi madrasas

References

External links 
 
 

Deobandi movement
Islam-related lists
Lists of books
Political bibliographies